Fèisean nan Gàidheal is the National Association of Scottish Gaelic Arts Youth Tuition Festivals. Established in 1988, it is the support organisation for the Fèisean (Scottish Gaelic for Festivals) which are local Gaelic Arts tuition festivals. The current Chief Executive Officer is Arthur Cormack.

In 2016, their project Fuaran was nominated for Community Project of the Year at MG ALBA Scots Trad Music Awards. Fuaran brought together young singers, aged 16-24, and tradition-bearers from the community to record traditional Gaelic songs.

See also
Meanbh-chuileag

External links
Official Website
Official YouTube channel

References

Scottish Gaelic language
Celtic music festivals
Arts organisations based in Scotland